Hakim Noury is a Moroccan television and film director.

Filmography
L'Enfance volée - The stolen childhood
 Le destin d’une Femme - The destiny of a woman
 Le marteau et l’enclume -
 Histoire d’amour - A love story
 Un simple fait divers
 Fiha El Malha ou soukar ou mabghatch tmoute
 Qalaq - (Anxiety)

References

Living people
Moroccan film directors
People from Casablanca
Year of birth missing (living people)